Thirty species of reptiles have been recorded in the US state of Minnesota, including 17 species of snakes, eleven species of turtle, and three species of lizard. Of those 31 species, two (Blanding's turtle and the wood turtle) have been listed as endangered by the International Union for Conservation of Nature, with another 20 listed as least concern and nine have not been evaluated.

Minnesota does not have an official state reptile. However, the Blanding's turtle was proposed as the reptile of the state in 1998 and 1999.

Snakes

Turtles

Lizards

Notes
 Total length refers to the total length of the lizard. Maximum body length is the measurement from snout to cloaca of the lizard.

References
General
 
 

Specific

Bibliography

External links
 
 

Reptiles
Minnesota